Acoustic ceiling may refer to:
Dropped ceiling
Popcorn ceiling